Gitary may refer to:
 Czerwone Gitary
 Poyushchiye Gitary